Adria is a feminine given name which may refer to:


Women
Adria Arjona (born 1992), Guatemalan and Puerto Rican actress
Adria Bernardi, American novelist and translator
Adria Dawn (born 1974), American actor, writer and producer
Adria Engel (born 1979), American tennis player
Adria Kain, Canadian singer
Adria LaViolette, American archaeologist
Adria Lawrence, American political scientist and professor
Adria Locke Langley (1899–1983), American writer
Adria Petty (born 1974), American director, editor, art director, and artist, daughter of rock musician Tom Petty
Adria Santana (1948–2011), Cuban actress
Adria Silva (born 1983), Brazilian Paralympic volleyball player
Adria Tennor, American actress, writer, and director
Adria Vasil, Canadian environmental journalist

Fictional characters
Adria (Stargate), a villain in the television series Stargate SG-1
Adria the witch, a character in the Diablo video game series

See also
Adria (disambiguation)
Adrian

Feminine given names